Michael Dilley can refer to:

 Michael Dilley (English cricketer) (born 1939), English cricketer
 Michael Dilley (South African cricketer) (born 1970), South African cricketer